Esteban Patricio Dunivicher Curutchet (born 1957) is a Chilean former footballer who played as a left winger for clubs in Chile and Belgium.

Career
A left winger, as a youth player, Dunivicher was with Universidad Católica in 1973. In 1974 he switched to Rangers de Talca and made his professional debut in the same year at the age of sixteen in the Chilean top division. He stayed with the club until 1976.

In the Chilean Primera División, he also played for Huachipato (1977–78), Green Cross Temuco (1979–80) and Trasandino (1984). 

In the Chilean Segunda División, he played for Lota Schwager (1981–82), Iberia  (1983) and Deportes Ovalle (1985).

After playing for Deportes Ovalle, he emigrated to Europe and played for both RRC Etterbeek and Rochefort FC in the Belgian Second Division.

After football
Dunivicher made his home in Belgium and has worked as a football avisory and coach at youth level.

Personal life
His father, José, was a football player and manager of Rangers de Talca.

References

1957 births
Living people
Chilean footballers
Chilean expatriate footballers
Rangers de Talca footballers
C.D. Huachipato footballers
Deportes Temuco footballers
Lota Schwager footballers
Deportes Iberia footballers
Trasandino footballers
Deportes Ovalle footballers
Chilean Primera División players
Primera B de Chile players
Challenger Pro League players
Chilean expatriate sportspeople in Belgium
Expatriate footballers in Belgium
Association football forwards
Chilean football managers
Chilean expatriate football managers
Place of birth missing (living people)